HMS Cordelia was an 11-gun  sloop of the Royal Navy launched in 1856 and sold in 1870.

Design

The class were armed with a single 32-pounder (58 cwt) gun on a pivot mount and ten 32-pounder (25 cwt) carronades on the broadside.  These guns were all smoothbore muzzle-loading, and were little changed from the standard guns of Nelson's era.

Propulsion was provided by a James Watt & Co two-cylinder horizontal single-expansion steam engine developing  and driving a single screw. A barque rig of sails was carried, which meant she had three masts with a square rig on the fore and main masts.

Construction
Cordelia was laid down at Pembroke Dockyard in October 1855 and launched on 3 July 1856. The total cost was £33,428, of which the machinery cost £9,014.

Royal Navy service
She was commissioned on 11 April 1857 under Commander Charles Egerton Harcourt-Vernon and initially sent to the East Indies Station until being assigned to the Australia Station in 1859. In 1860 she served in the First Taranaki War. Command passed in June 1861 to Commander Francis Alexander Hume; on returning to the UK, she was paid off at Plymouth on 2 April 1862. 

She was recommissioned on 24 June 1864 under Commander John Binney Scott and then served in the North American and West Indies Station until she was paid off on 9 July 1868 at Plymouth; meanwhile Commander Thomas Alexis De Wahl had been given command on 3 March 1865 when Scott became invalided, and was in turn succeeded on 16 September 1867 by Commander Charles Parry.

Fate
She was sold on 12 May 1870 for breaking up at Plymouth.

Notes

Citations

References
Bastock, John (1988), Ships on the Australia Station, Child & Associates Publishing Pty Ltd; Frenchs Forest, Australia. 
 
 

 

1856 ships
Ships built in Pembroke Dock
Sloops of the Royal Navy
Victorian-era sloops of the United Kingdom